Olga Anatolyevna Slyusareva (born 28 April 1969 in Chervonyi Donets, Ukrainian SSR) is a Russian professional racing cyclist. She won a gold medal at the 2004 Olympic Games in the points race, bronze medal at the 2000 Olympic Games in the points race, and at the 2004 Olympic Games in the road race. Since 2019, she is the Mayor of Tula, a city about 193km (120mi) South of Moscow.

Career highlights

1995
2nd, World Championship, Track, Sprint, Elite, Bogotá
1998
1st, European Championship, Track Omnium
3rd, World Championship, Track, Points race, Elite, Bordeaux
2nd, World Cup, Track, Points race, Victoria, British Columbia
1999
1st, European Championship, Track Omnium
3rd, National Championship, Road, Elite, Russia
3rd, World Cup, Track, Points race, Mexico City
1st, World Cup, Track, Points race, Frisco, Texas
2000
3rd, Olympic Summer Games, Track, Points race, Sydney
3rd, World Championship, Track, Points race, Elite, Manchester
2001
1st, European Championship, Track Omnium
1st, Stage 4, Tour de l'Aude Cycliste Féminin
1st, Stage 10, Tour de l'Aude Cycliste Féminin
2nd, World Championship, Track, Pursuit, Elite, Antwerp
1st, World Championship, Track, Points race, Elite, Antwerp
1st, Trophée International
2002
3rd, National Championship, Road, Elite, Russia
2nd, World Championship, Track, Pursuit, Elite, Copenhagen
1st, World Championship, Track, Points race, Elite, Copenhagen
3rd, World Championship, Track, Scratch, Elite, Copenhagen
1st, World Cup, Track, Scratch, Moscow
2nd, World Cup, Track, Pursuit, Moscow
1st, World Cup, Track, Points race, Moscow
2003
1st, Stage 3, Eko Tour Dookola Polski
1st, Stage 4, Eko Tour Dookola Polski
3rd, General Classification, Eko Tour Dookola Polski
1st, European Championship, Track Omnium
3rd, World Championship, Track, Pursuit, Elite, Stuttgart
1st, World Championship, Track, Points race, Elite, Stuttgart
1st, World Championship, Track, Scratch, Elite, Stuttgart
2004
1st, World Championship, Track, Points race, Elite, Melbourne
3rd, World Championship, Track, Scratch, Elite, Melbourne
1st, World Cup, Track, Points race, Moscow
2nd, World Cup, Track, Pursuit, Moscow
1st, World Cup, Track, Scratch, Moscow
1st, GP Liberazione
1st, Stage 7, Giro d'Italia Donne, Oggiono
3rd, Olympic Summer Games, Road, Athens
1st, Olympic Summer Games, Track, Points race, Athens
2005
2nd, World Championship, Track, Points race, Elite, Los Angeles
1st, World Championship, Track, Scratch, Elite, Los Angeles
2nd, National Championship, Road, Elite, Russia, Moscow
1st, European Championship, Track Omnium, Fiorenzuola
1st, World Cup, Track, Points race, Moscow
3rd, World Cup, Track, Pursuit, Moscow
2006
2nd, World Championship, Track, Pursuit, Elite, Bordeaux
2nd, World Championship, Track, Points race, Elite, Bordeaux
3rd, World Championship, Track, Scratch, Elite, Bordeaux
3rd, Berner Rundfahrt, Bern
3rd, GP Liberazione
1st, Trofeo Riviera Della Versilia
2nd, Giro del Friuli
1st, National Championship, Road, ITT, Elite, Russia, Penza
1st, National Championship, Road, Elite, Russia, Penza
1st, Stage 3, Giro d'Italia Donne, Marciano
1st, Stage 4, Giro d'Italia Donne, Arezzo
1st, Stage 6, Giro d'Italia Donne, Novi Ligure
2007
1st, World Cup, Track, Team Pursuit, Sydney
2nd, World Cup, Track, Team Pursuit, Beijing
2008
2nd, World Cup, Track, Team Pursuit, Los Angeles

External links
 
Profile at ''infosport.ru (russisch)

1969 births
Living people
People from Chervony Donets, Kharkiv Oblast
Russian female cyclists
Cyclists at the 2000 Summer Olympics
Cyclists at the 2004 Summer Olympics
Cyclists at the 2008 Summer Olympics
Olympic cyclists of Russia
Olympic gold medalists for Russia
Olympic bronze medalists for Russia
Olympic medalists in cycling
UCI Track Cycling World Champions (women)
Medalists at the 2004 Summer Olympics
Medalists at the 2000 Summer Olympics
Russian track cyclists